ζ Microscopii, Latinised as Zeta Microscopii, is a solitary, yellow-white hued star in the southern constellation of Microscopium. It is faintly visible to the naked eye with an apparent visual magnitude of +5.31. Based upon an annual parallax shift of 28.27 mas as seen from the Earth, it is 115 light years from the Sun. The star is moving away from the Sun with a radial velocity of +4.6 km/s.

This is an F-type main-sequence star with a stellar classification of F5 V. This indicates that, at the age of 2.2 billion years, it is still generating energy through hydrogen fusion at its core. It is radiating 7.5 times the Sun's luminosity from its photosphere at an effective temperature of 6,471 K. The star has an estimated 1.4 times the mass of the Sun and is spinning with a moderately high projected rotational velocity of 44.4 km/s.

References

F-type main-sequence stars
Microscopium
Microscopii, Zeta
Durchmusterung objects
200163
103882
8048